Arne Johan Almeland (born 19 February 1965) is a Norwegian sprint canoer who competed in the late 1980s. He won a gold medal in the K-4 10000 m event at the 1987 ICF Canoe Sprint World Championships in Duisburg.

Alemland also competed in the K-4 1000 m event at the 1988 Summer Olympics in Seoul, but did not finish their semifinal round.

References

1965 births
Canoeists at the 1988 Summer Olympics
Living people
Norwegian male canoeists
Olympic canoeists of Norway
ICF Canoe Sprint World Championships medalists in kayak